Vinit Ajit Indulkar (born 26 August 1984, in Sholapur, Maharashtra) is an Indian former cricketer. He played for Mumbai cricket team and  Himachal Pradesh in 40 Ranji Trophy matches.

See also
 List of Mumbai cricketers

References

External links
 

1984 births
Living people
Indian cricketers
Mumbai cricketers
Himachal Pradesh cricketers
Kolkata Knight Riders cricketers
Cricketers from Mumbai
People from Solapur